Giorgi III Gurieli (died 1684), of the Georgian House of Gurieli, was Prince of Guria from 1669 to 1684 and King of Imereti from 1681 to 1683. He was energetically involved in civil wars in western Georgian polities, which he sought to bring under his sway. He was killed in battle while trying to recover the lost throne of Imereti.

Accession 
Giorgi was the eldest son of Kaikhosro I, Prince-regnant of Guria. After the assassination of his father, Giorgi and his brother Malakia fled to the protection of the Ottoman pasha of Akhaltsikhe, whose help he exploiting in securing the princely throne of Guria after the death of Demetre Gurieli in 1668. According to the 18th-century Georgian historian Prince Vakhushti Giorgi was "powerful, brave, superb warrior, godless, bloodthirsty, and a merciless slave-trader". He successfully fought the piratical Abkhaz who raided the coast of Guria on more than one occasion.

Conflicts in Imereti and Mingrelia 
In 1672, Giorgi, with an extravagant bribe, bought the pasha's support against King Bagrat V of Imereti, with an eye on the king's beautiful wife Tamar, whom Gurieli admired as claimed by Prince Vakhushti. Bagrat was defeated by the allies at Kutaisi and made a prisoner, but released after the pasha extracted a greater bribe from him and became convinced that taking the fortress of Kvara—where Tamar had taken refuge—was a futile endeavor. Bagrat promptly avenged Gurieli, attacking and looting Guria that same year. Eventually, the two men reconciled; Giorgi married Bagrat's daughter Darejan in 1674 and offered him a shelter when Bagrat was deposed in favor of Archil, son of Vakhtang V of Kartli, in 1678. Archil, further, restored Bagrat's wife Tamar, an Imeretian femme fatale, to her previous husband Levan III Dadiani, Prince of Mingrelia. Gurieli invoked his ties with the Ottoman government; the pasha of Erzurum arrived with troops and helped Bagrat reclaim his crown and wife in 1679. The defeated Dadiani managed to retain his principality at the expense of surrendering his only heir Manuchar as a hostage to Giorgi Gurieli. On Levan's death in 1680, Gurieli's claim to Dadiani's succession was rejected by the Mingrelians. Giorgi then executed Manuchar and attempted to seize Mingrelia by force, but failed.

King of Imereti  
King Bagrat's death in 1681 provided Giorgi Gurieli with an opportunity to claim the long-coveted Imeretian crown and Queen Tamar for himself. As Bagrat's only surviving heir Alexander, a natural son by a concubine, was held as a hostage in Kartli, Giorgi Gurieli was installed by the Imeretian nobles as their king. He then divorced his child-bride Darejan and illegally married his mother-in-law Tamar. That same year, Giorgi made another attempt to seize Mingrelia, but the Mingrelian magnate Giorgi Lipartiani foiled his designs and installed the late Levan Dadiani's namesake natural son. 

The incestuous king quickly lost support among the Imeretians. In 1683, at their request, the pasha of Akhaltsikhe convinced King Giorgi XI of Kartli to release Bagrat the Blind's son Alexander from custody and secured the sultan's approval for his enthronement in Imereti. Giorgi Gurieli was forced to retire to Guria. Next year, he mounted a revolt of nobility against Alexander, involving Shoshita, Duke of Racha, Princes Lordkipanidze and Chijavadze, the nobles of Lechkhumi, and Giorgi Lipartiani, regent of Mingrelia. Gurieli arrived with his troops in Imereti and looted the venerated icon of the Theotokos of Blachernae. Alexander found major support in the princes Abashidze, notably Paata Abashidze, and Mikeladze. At the bloody battle of Rokiti, Gurieli was defeated and killed. His sons fled to Akhaltsikhe, while his brother Malakia was made Prince of Guria by the victorious king Alexander.

Family 
Giorgi Gurieli was married three times. He wed Princess Tamar, née Chijavadze, in 1667 and divorced her in 1677 to marry Darejan, daughter of King Bagrat V of Imereti and Queen Tamar, daughter of Constantine I, Prince of Mukhrani. Tamar Chijavadze later remarried Prince Katsia Chikovani and then Giorgi-Malakia Abashidze. In 1681, Giorgi married his own mother-in-law Queen Tamar.

All of Giorgi's children were born of his first marriage to Tamar Chijavadze:

 Prince Kaikhosro II Gurieli (1669–1689), Prince of Guria (1685–1689);
 Prince Mamia III Gurieli (died 1714), Prince of Guria (1689–1714);
 Prince Malakia;
 Prince Otia; 
 Princess N., probably Tamar, the second wife of Simon of Imereti.

References 

1684 deaths
Year of birth unknown
House of Gurieli
Kings of Imereti
Eastern Orthodox monarchs
17th-century people from Georgia (country)